Hsinchu County Constituency was a single-member constituency for legislative elections from 2008 to 2016. In 2019, it was split into constituencies I and II.

Geography
 Hsinchu County

List of representatives

Election results

See also 
 Hsinchu County electoral constituencies

References 

Constituencies in Hsinchu County